Xanthostemon oppositifolius is a species of plant in the family Myrtaceae. It is found in Australia and Papua New Guinea. It is threatened by habitat loss.

References

oppositifolius
Myrtales of Australia
Flora of Papua New Guinea
Endangered flora of Australia
Nature Conservation Act vulnerable biota
Endangered biota of Queensland
Vulnerable flora of Australia
Flora of Queensland
Taxonomy articles created by Polbot